Florence "Bobby" Mary Terry (née Taylor), (1898–1976), was an Australian aviator. She was the first woman to own her own airplane in Australia, the first woman endorsed to fly seaplanes and the second woman to obtain a commercial pilot's license in Australia.

Life
Terry was the daughter of Captain R. S. Taylor of Brisbane, Queensland.

She was the second wife of John Edgar Terry (1884–1934) with whom she had one child who died in infancy. In 1938, she married fellow pilot Monte Fowler.

Terry obtained her 'A' pilot license in 1928. In 1929 she received her the endorsement to fly seaplanes after lessons in a Dornier Libelle under the instruction of Jerry Pentland. The following year, 1930, she obtained her 'B' pilot license. She was a member of the Ninety-Nines.

References

1898 births
1976 deaths
Australian aviators